Systa is the debut album by female hip-hop duo, Terri & Monica. It is their second album overall as they released Love Me or Leave Me as members of The Gyrlz.  It was released on September 21, 1993, for Epic Records and featured production from Horace Brown, Bryce Wilson and Grand Puba.  The two singles that were released were "Intentions" and "Uh Huh". "I've Been Waiting" was featured on the soundtrack to Poetic Justice, a motion picture starring Janet Jackson and Tupac Shakur.

Track listing
Credits adapted from liner notes.

"Uh-Huh" (Terri Robinson, Monica Payne, Tara Geter, Kevin Smith) - 3:35
"Over It" (Terri Robinson, Monica Payne, Tara Geter, Maxwell Dixon) - 3:46
"Intentions" (Terri Robinson, Monica Payne, Tara Geter, Kevin Smith) - 3:27
"Next Time" (Terri Robinson, Monica Payne, Bryce Wilson) - 3:58
"I've Been Waiting" (Terri Robinson, Tara Geter, Kevin Deane) - 4:20
"I Need Your Love" (Terri Robinson, Gordon Chambers, James Alexander) - 4:58
"The Way You Make Me Feel" (Terri Robinson, Monica Payne, Tara Geter, Horace Brown) - 5:07
"Temptation" (Terri Robinson, Monica Payne, Horace Brown) - 4:53
"Where Are You Now" (Terri Robinson, Monica Payne, Tara Geter, Horace Brown) - 5:10
"When the Tables Turn" (Monica Payne, Tara Geter, Dennis Moorehead, Steven White) - 5:05

Samples
 "Uh-Huh" contains a sample of "Lisa Listen to Me", as performed by Blood, Sweat & Tears
 "Intentions" contains a sample of "Supernatural Thing", as performed by Ben E. King

Personnel
Credits adapted from liner notes and Allmusic. 
 Terri Robinson - lead and background vocals
 Monica Payne - lead and background vocals
 Tara Geter - background vocals, co-executive producer
 Horace Brown - background vocals
 Bernard Grobman - guitar
 Clyde Jones - guitar
 Jeff Andrews - bass
 Herman Crump - keyboards
 Gordon Chambers - keyboards, trumpet solo
 Oscar Cartaya - bass
 T-Marlow - recording engineer
 Eric "Ibo" Butler - recording engineer
 Charles Alexander - recording engineer, mixing
 Dave Kennedy - mixing
 Warren Woods - mixing
 Angela Piva - mixing
 Paris Davis - executive producer
 Nick Vacarro - photography
 Jennifer Roddle - design

References

1993 albums
Terri & Monica albums